West Mifflin is a borough in Allegheny County, Pennsylvania, United States, located southeast of downtown Pittsburgh.  The population was 19,589 at the 2020 census. It is named after Thomas Mifflin, 1st Governor of Pennsylvania, signer of the United States Constitution, and 1st Quartermaster General of the United States Army.

Although the borough is heavily residential, it is home to one of America's oldest traditional amusement parks, Kennywood Park. Other employers include advanced naval nuclear propulsion technology research and development facility, Bettis Atomic Power Laboratory; monorail manufacturer Bombardier; US Steel's Mon Valley Works–Irvin Plant; Community College of Allegheny County's South Campus; and the Allegheny County Airport.

Geography
The landscape is largely hilly and wooded, and the borough's eastern boundary is contiguous with the Monongahela River three separate times. Much of the original landscape has been altered as a result of the historic dumping of steel mill byproducts such as slag and fly ash.

Environmental monitoring
Coal mining has also affected the flow and water quality of small streams.  Land developers have produced more level ground by clean-filling ravines and other small parcels of land to improve the land usage.  Toxic waste dump areas are  monitored with water quality improvement with bioremediation successfully implemented.  West Mifflin operates its own sewage treatment facility. The Environmental Protection agency regulates 78 facilities for environmental compliance. Asbestos waste and radioactive waste and controls were addressed in 1991.

Surrounding and adjacent neighborhoods
West Mifflin has ten land borders, including the Pittsburgh neighborhoods of Lincoln Place and Hays as well as Munhall and Whitaker, to the north, Duquesne to the east, Dravosburg to the southeast, Jefferson Hills and Pleasant Hills to the south, Baldwin to the west and also a short border with Clairton to the south.

Three segments of West Mifflin run along the Monongahela River.  Adjacent to these areas across the river are Braddock, North Braddock, McKeesport and Glassport.

Demographics

As of the census of 2000, there were 22,464 people, 9,509 households, and 6,475 families residing in the borough. The population density was 1,586.2 people per square mile (612.5/km2). There were 9,966 housing units at an average density of 703.7 per square mile (271.7/km2). The racial makeup of the borough was 89.64% White, 8.85% African American, 0.12% Native American, 0.25% Asian, 0.06% Pacific Islander, 0.25% from other races, and 0.84% from two or more races. Hispanic or Latino of any race were 0.57% of the population.

There were 9,509 households, out of which 26.8% had children under the age of 18 living with them, 50.6% were married couples living together, 13.7% had a female householder with no husband present, and 31.9% were non-families. 29.0% of all households were made up of individuals, and 15.3% had someone living alone who was 65 years of age or older. The average household size was 2.35 and the average family size was 2.89.

In the borough the population was spread out, with 21.5% under the age of 18, 6.9% from 18 to 24, 26.2% from 25 to 44, 23.8% from 45 to 64, and 21.6% who were 65 years of age or older. The median age was 42 years. For every 100 females, there were 89.4 males. For every 100 females age 18 and over, there were 84.3 males.

The median income for a household in the borough was $36,130, and the median income for a family was $46,192. Males had a median income of $36,984 versus $26,529 for females. The per capita income for the borough was $18,140. About 8.8% of families and 10.2% of the population were below the poverty line, including 16.6% of those under age 18 and 9.1% of those age 65 or over.  The unemployment rate is just over 6%.

Government and politics

Schools
Seven schools exist in West Mifflin: four public schools and three private schools. West Mifflin public schools belong to one district-West Mifflin Area School District. School students in the neighboring boroughs of Whitaker and Duquesne also attend school in the West Mifflin School District.

There are two West Mifflin elementary schools, one West Mifflin middle school, one West Mifflin High School, and 13 West Mifflin preschools.

New England Elementary has been closed since June 2012.

Saint Agnes School has been closed since June 2019.

New Emerson has been closed since 2020.

Prior to July 2016, Wilson Christian Academy existed at 1900 Clairton Road. It was merged into Cornerstone Christian Preparatory Academy, which is currently at that location.

West Mifflin school administrators' use of school credit cards for meals has been called into question. The West Mifflin School District charges tuition for nearby Duquesne students to attend.

All-State Career School has a campus in West Mifflin. Class A CDL licenses have been in-demand in the area with the rise of fracking.

Community College of Allegheny County also has its South Campus in the borough, at 1750 Clairton Road.

Transportation and infrastructure 
West Mifflin is accessible primarily by road, though no Interstate highways pass through the area. The main road passing through most of the area is Pennsylvania Route 885, which intersects with Pennsylvania Route 51 nearby in the borough of Whitehall.

West Mifflin is the location of Allegheny County Airport, a general aviation airport; as a result, most of West Mifflin is in Class D airspace. The nearest airports with commercial service are Pittsburgh International Airport and Arnold Palmer Regional Airport.

In media
In one episode of the skit Monster Chiller Horror Theatre with Count Floyd on the Canadian TV comedy series Second City Television, the Count talks about a fictional horror film called Blood Sucking Monkeys from West Mifflin, Pennsylvania.

References

Further reading
 D. R. Connors, Westinghouse Electric Corporation, Bettis Atomic Power Laboratory, West Mifflin, Pennsylvania, letter to R. L Pearson, Oak Ridge National Laboratory, Oak Ridge, Tennessee, "Update of Idaho Naval Reactor Facilities Miscellaneous Waste Inventory for the 1992 Integrated Data Base Report," dated May 5, 1992.

External links
 Borough of West Mifflin official website
 West Mifflin Borough on Facebook
 West Mifflin Borough Recreation official website 
 West Mifflin Borough Recreation on Facebook
 West Mifflin Borough Police Department official website 
 West Mifflin Borough Police Department on Facebook
 West Mifflin Community Website
 History of West Mifflin
 West Mifflin Area School District
 West Mifflin Sanitary Sewer Municipal Authority

Populated places established in 1788
Pittsburgh metropolitan area
Boroughs in Allegheny County, Pennsylvania
Pennsylvania populated places on the Monongahela River
Superfund sites in Pennsylvania
1942 establishments in Pennsylvania